The 1936 Saint Louis Billikens football team was an American football team that represented Saint Louis University as an independent during the 1936 college football season. In its third season under head coach Cecil Muellerleile, the team compiled a 5–4–1 record and outscored opponents by a total of 155 to 114. The team played its home games at Edward J. Walsh Memorial Stadium in St. Louis.

Schedule

References

Saint Louis
Saint Louis Billikens football seasons
Saint Louis Billikens football